The 1985–86 Maryland Terrapins men's basketball team represented the University of Maryland, College Park during the 1985–86 NCAA Division I men's basketball season.

Roster

Schedule

|-
!colspan=9 style=|

|-
!colspan=9 style=|

Rankings

Awards and honors
Len Bias – ACC Player of the Year, Consensus First-team All-American

Team players in the 1986 NBA Draft

References

Maryland Terrapins men's basketball seasons
Maryland
Maryland
Maryland
Maryland